The 2023 Pac-12 Conference baseball tournament will be held from May 23 through 27 at Scottsdale Stadium in Scottsdale, Arizona.  It will be the second postseason championship event sponsored by the Pac-12 Conference since 1978.  The nine team, pool play tournament winner will earn the league's automatic bid to the 2023 NCAA Division I baseball tournament.

Seeds
This tournament will feature 9 out of 12 teams in this conference. There will be three teams in each pool, with each team playing two games in pool play, with the three pool winners & one wild card team advancing to the single elimination finals.  The seedings will be determined upon completion of regular season play. The winning percentage of the teams in conference play determined the tournament seedings. There are tiebreakers in place to seed teams with identical conference records.

Pools composition
There will be three teams in each pool, with each team playing two games in pool play.  Teams selected for pool play will be based on final standings in the 2023 Pac-12 Regular Season.  The Number 1, 6 & 9 seeds will be placed in pool A.  The Number 2, 5 & 8 seeds will be placed in pool B.  The Number 3, 4 & 7 seeds will be placed in pool C.  The three pools will play a round-robin style tournament with the winners advancing to the Friday single-elimination semifinals along with one Wild Card team.  The Wild Card will be determined by the best record of the non-advancing teams.  Any tiebreaker will be awarded to the highest seeded team.

Finals

Schedule
2023 Bracket

References

Tournament
Pac-12 Conference Baseball Tournament
Pac-12
College baseball tournaments in Arizona
Baseball competitions in Scottsdale, Arizona